Mundesley /ˈmʌndz.li/ is a coastal village and a civil parish in the English county of Norfolk. The nearest railway station is at North Walsham, for the Bittern Line which runs between Sheringham and Norwich. The nearest airport is Norwich Airport. The village sits astride the B1159 coast road that links Cromer and Caister-on-Sea, and is at the eastern end of the B1145 a route which runs between King's Lynn and Mundesley. Mundesley is within the Norfolk Coast AONB. It has a resident population of around 2,695 (parish, 2001 census), measured at 2,758 in the 2011 Census. The River Mun or Mundesley Beck flows into the sea here. On 5 September 2022 Mundesley beach won the North Norfolk District Council Battle of the Beaches to be recognised as the top beach in North Norfolk in a close run off against West Runton beach.

History
The villages name means 'Mul's/Mundel's wood/clearing'.

Mundesley has an entry in the Domesday Book of 1086, with the town's name recorded as Muleslai. The main landholder was William de Warenne, and the survey also lists a church.

Second World War
The Mundesley Memorial Bomb is dedicated to Army teams who removed mines after the Second World War. There is a War memorial inside the Church and on the seafront at the Coastwatch station and museum. Near to the church is a World War II gun emplacement, which now stands near the edge of the cliff, due to coastal erosion.

Governance
An electoral ward in the same name exists. This ward includes Bacton and had had total population at the 2011 Census of 4,191.

Tourism

Mundesley is a popular seaside holiday destination due to its sandy beaches and has a number of holiday chalet and caravan parks and hotels. Just to the south of Mundesley on the road to Paston is a popular windmill, Stow Mill. The village was a popular seaside resort in Victorian times, benefiting from its own railway station which closed in 1964.

Golf course
The village has an historic golf course in the Mun Valley, designed with the help of six-times Open Champion Harry Vardon. Vardon convalesced at the nearby sanitorium while recovering from tuberculosis and his association with the course spanned many years. It is said that he scored his only hole-in-one on what is now the sixth. The course was reduced to nine holes when land was required for wartime farming, which was very important in that era.

Village amenities

Parish church

All Saints' Church is located on the cliffs above the sea. It was fully restored between 1904 and 1914.

Village centre
The village centre offers shops including a butchers, clothing, arts and crafts, chemist and convenience stores. Mundesley also has its own medical centre and primary school. There is an adventure island crazy golf park close to the seafront. There is a very small maritime museum which is also the local lookout of the National Coastwatch Institution, a charity offering 365 days' lookout in over 50 stations along the British coast.

Public houses and hotels
There are two pubs in Mundesley. One of the oldest is the Ship Inn situated on the seafront. Its first landlord is listed as being Paul Harrison in 1836. Its flint construction is characteristic of the older parts of the village.  A little inland, on the road to Paston, is the Royal Hotel, where Lord Nelson is said to have lived for a while. Plentiful lodging is available. The Link's and Seaward Crest chalet parks are very close and are very popular.

Notable residents
Ian Thornton OBE - Chief Executive Officer of the Norwich City Community Sports Foundation

See also
Mundesley Volunteer Inshore Lifeboat

References

External links

Coastwatch Mundesley
Mundesley Maritime Museum
Live Weather in Mundesley
Mundesley on Sea Parish Council
Mundesley Photo Gallery
Mundesley village website
Mundesley Free Church

 
Villages in Norfolk
Populated coastal places in Norfolk
Civil parishes in Norfolk
Seaside resorts in England
Beaches of Norfolk
North Norfolk
Tuberculosis sanatoria in the United Kingdom